Two-Way Stretch, is a 1960 British comedy film, about a group of prisoners who plan to break out of jail, commit a robbery, and then break back into jail again, thus giving them the perfect alibi – that they were behind bars when the robbery occurred. However, their plans are disrupted by the arrival of a strict new Chief Prison Officer.

The film was directed by Robert Day from a screenplay by Vivian Cox, John Warren and Len Heath, with additional dialogue by Alan Hackney. The film boasts a cast of characters played by, among others, Peter Sellers, Wilfrid Hyde-White, Lionel Jeffries and Bernard Cribbins.

Plot
Three prisoners nearing the end of their jail sentences, "Dodger" Lane, "Jelly" Knight and "Lennie the Dip", are visited by a vicar seeking to find employment for them. He is actually "Soapy" Stevens, a conman, who proposes a large-scale diamond robbery. They will also all have alibis, because they will break out of prison, commit the robbery and then break back in. With the assistance of Dodger's girlfriend Ethel and Lennie's mother the trio smuggle themselves out in a prison van. The operation is almost foiled by the disciplinarian "Sour" Crout, the new chief prison officer. Everything goes to plan and the trio hide the diamonds in the Governor's office until they are released and can take them away. All goes well until the sack of diamonds is lost on a train. Stevens is recognised and arrested, but the others get away.

Cast

 Peter Sellers as "Dodger" Lane
 Lionel Jeffries as Chief Prison Officer "Sour" Crout
 Wilfrid Hyde-White as "Soapy" Stevens
 Bernard Cribbins as Lennie ("The Dip") Price
 David Lodge as "Jelly" Knight
 Irene Handl as Mrs Price
 Liz Fraser as Ethel
 Maurice Denham as Horatio Bennett, the Prison Governor
 Beryl Reid as Miss Pringle
 George Woodbridge as Chief Prison Officer Jenkins
 Edwin Brown as Warder Charlie
 Cyril Chamberlain as Gate Warder – Day 
 Wallas Eaton as Gate Warder – Night 
 William Abney as Visiting Room Warder 
 Thorley Walters as Colonel Parkright 
 John Wood as Captain 
 Robert James as Police Superintendent 
 Walter Hudd as Reverend Patterson 
 Mario Fabrizi as Jones 
 Warren Mitchell as Tailor 
 John Glyn-Jones as Lawyer 
 Arthur Mullard as Fred 
 Ian Wilson as Milkman
 Edward Dentith as Detective 
 John Harvey as Governor Rockhampton Prison

Production

The prison scenes were filmed at the South Cavalry Barracks at Aldershot, and the security van robbery at Pirbright Arch in the village of Brookwood in Surrey.

Release 
The film opened at the Warner Cinema in London on 11 February 1960 before going on general release from the 14th.

Reception
Two-Way Stretch was the fourth most popular film at the British box office in 1960.

Kine Weekly called it a "money maker" at the British box office in 1960. 

In The New York Times, Bosley Crowther gave it a positive review, writing, "the script by John Warren and Len Heath follows a straight line and is clever and full of good Cockney wit. Robert Day's direction is lively, in the vein of civilized farce, and the performances are delicious, right down the line," concluding, "Mr. Sellers is still on the rise."

References

External links
 
 

1960 films
1960s crime comedy films
British crime comedy films
British black-and-white films
British prison films
1960s English-language films
Films directed by Robert Day
1960 comedy films
British Lion Films films
1960s British films